Elk Township is a township in Clayton County, Iowa, USA.  As of the 2000 census, its population was 490.

History
Elk Township is named for the abundance of elk once found there.

Geography
According to the USGS, it contains six cemeteries: Asbury, Ebenezer, Elk Creek, Hamlett, Mount Harmony and Wagner.

The streams of Brownfield Creek, Cow Branch, Pine Creek, Rabbit Creek, Steeles Branch and Wolf Creek run through this township.

Notes

References
 USGS Geographic Names Information System (GNIS)

External links
 US-Counties.com
 City-Data.com

Townships in Clayton County, Iowa
Townships in Iowa